LWN.net is a computing webzine with an emphasis on free software and software for Linux and other Unix-like operating systems. It consists of a weekly issue, separate stories which are published most days, and threaded discussion attached to every story. Most news published daily are short summaries of articles published elsewhere, and are free to all viewers. Original articles are usually published weekly on Thursdays and are available only to subscribers for two weeks, after which they become free as well. LWN.net is part of Eklektix, Inc.

LWN caters to a more technical audience than other Linux/free software publications. It is often praised for its in-depth coverage of Linux kernel internals and Linux kernel mailing list (LKML) discussions.

The acronym "LWN" originally stood for Linux Weekly News; that name is no longer used because the site no longer covers exclusively Linux-related topics, and it has daily as well as weekly content.

History 

Founded by Jonathan Corbet and Elizabeth Coolbaugh and published since January 1998, LWN was originally a free site devoted to collecting Linux news, published weekly.

In 2000, Tucows acquired Linux Weekly News (which was then "unacquired" in 2002).

At the end of May 2002, LWN announced a redesigned site. Among the changes was a facility for readers to post comments about stories.

On July 25, 2002, LWN announced that due to its inability to raise enough funds through donations, the following issue would be its last.
Following an outpouring of support from readers, however, the editors of LWN decided to continue publishing, albeit with a subscription model. New weekly editions of LWN are initially only available to readers who subscribe at one of three levels (group subscriptions are also available). After a 2-weeks long delay, each issue becomes freely available to readers who are unable or unwilling to pay.

Contributors 

LWN.net staff, as of February 2023, consists of:
 Jonathan Corbet, Executive Editor, who manages "Kernel coverage and more"
 Jake Edge, Editor, who manages "Python coverage and more"
LWN.net also purchases a number of articles from freelance authors.

See also 

 DistroWatch
 Slashdot
 Phoronix

References

External links 
 
 
 

American technology news websites
Companies based in Colorado
Online computer magazines
Internet properties established in 1998
Linux magazines
Linux websites